James Elliot Donnelly (18 December 1893 – 3 June 1959) was an Irish professional football player and manager. As a player, he played as a full back in the Football League for Blackburn Rovers, Accrington Stanley, Southend United, Brentford and Thames. After his retirement as a player, Donnelly became a manager and coach and as part of an FA coaching programme, he was sent abroad and managed Građanski Zagreb, Turkey and Amsterdamsche FC. He also held coaching roles at Thames, in Belgium and at AS Ambrosiana-Inter.

Personal life
Donnelly served in the Royal Artillery during the First World War.

He was married to Jane Isherwood.

Career statistics

References

1959 deaths
1893 births
Military personnel from County Mayo
People from Ballina, County Mayo
British Army personnel of World War I
Royal Artillery personnel
Irish association footballers (before 1923)
Association football fullbacks
Irish expatriate sportspeople in Belgium
Irish expatriate sportspeople in Italy
Clitheroe F.C. players
Republic of Ireland association footballers
Republic of Ireland football managers
Republic of Ireland expatriate football managers
Blackburn Rovers F.C. players
Accrington Stanley F.C. (1891) players
Southend United F.C. players
Brentford F.C. players
Thames A.F.C. players
HŠK Građanski Zagreb managers
English Football League players
Turkey national football team managers
Amsterdamsche FC managers
Clitheroe F.C. managers
Expatriate football managers in Yugoslavia
Expatriate football managers in Turkey
Irish expatriate sportspeople in England
Irish expatriate sportspeople in Yugoslavia
Irish expatriate sportspeople in Turkey
Expatriate football managers in the Netherlands
Irish expatriate sportspeople in the Netherlands